R.C. I Medicei is an Italian rugby union club currently competing in the Top12. They are based in Florence, in Tuscany. They were founded in 2015.

History

Rugby arrived in Tuscany with university students in 1931, with a team called GUF Firenze being founded and for most of the pre-war period played in the National Division, and after the war were promoted to the then top level of Italian rugby becoming CUS Firenze, continuing to play in the upper division until 1983-84.

CUS Firenze continued as a team until 2007 when its sporting title was taken over by Firenze 1931, which retained the colours and field of the previous club and in 2010 merged with Rugby Firenze 1981.

On June 25, 2015 the foundation of the RC I Medicei was announced at a press conference held at the Padovani sports centre. The new club was born from the merger by incorporation of the ex-franchises of  I Cavalieri di Prato, who only two seasons before, in the Top12 2012-13 season, had lost the final of the championship against Mogliano, but had subsequently had faced a financial crisis that led the team to end the 2014-15 tournament in last place with no wins. The I Medicei team took the Serie A sports title from which the team started under the technical guidance of Pasquale Presutti, who had previously played and coached Petrarca and Fiamme Oro and played for Italy in the 1970s.

The debut tournament of the new club, in Serie A 2015-16, saw the Medici finish second in their group in the first phase and fourth in the following promotion pool. It was in the following tournament that the team managed to improve, repeating second place in the first phase but winning its own pool promotion in front of a top-flight of the Top12 competition. Then in the semifinal the Medici defeated Verona and played L'Aquila in the final, winning in the match for the title in Parma for 38-14. They were thus promoted to the Top12, 33 years after the last presence of Florence side in the top division.

Current squad

The I Medicei squad for the 2019–20 season is:

References

External links
 Official website

Italian rugby union teams
Rugby clubs established in 2015
2015 establishments in Italy
Sport in Florence